Edgar Martins is a Mozambican swimmer. He competed in the men's 100 metre freestyle at the 1980 Summer Olympics.

References

External links
 

Year of birth missing (living people)
Living people
Mozambican male freestyle swimmers
Olympic swimmers of Mozambique
Swimmers at the 1980 Summer Olympics
Place of birth missing (living people)